Pseudomonas taetrolens is a Gram-negative, nonsporulating, motile, rod-shaped bacterium that causes mustiness in eggs. Based on 16S rRNA analysis, P. taetrolens has been placed in the P. chlororaphis group.

References

External links
Type strain of Pseudomonas taetrolens at BacDive -  the Bacterial Diversity Metadatabase

Pseudomonadales
Bacteria described in 1957